Timoria were an Italian rock group, active between 1985 and 2003.

Career
The group formed in Brescia in 1985 with the name Precious Time. In 1986 they adopted the name Timoria ("Vengeance" in Ancient Greek) and took part at Descomusic, a festival organized by the newspaper Giornale di Brescia, winning the competition. After winning another festival, "Rock Targato Italia", they were put under contract by PolyGram and released their first single, "Signornò".

Produced by former Litfiba member Gianni Moroccolo, in 1990 the band released their first album, Colori che esplodono, which was both a critical and commercial success. In 1991 they entered the Newcomers competition at the 41st edition of the Sanremo Music Festival with the song "L'uomo che ride", winning the Critics' Award.

In 1997, after the release of the album Eta Beta, following irreconcilable conflicts with the songwriter of the group Omar Pedrini, the lead singer  Francesco Renga left the band and started a successful solo career, being replaced as lead singer by the same Pedrini and by newcomer Sasha Torrisi.

In 2002 the band came back to the Sanremo Music Festival, entering the main competition with the song "CasaMia". In 2003, following the release of the live album Timoria live: generazione senza vento, they announced a five-years hiatus which eventually resulted in the dissolution of the band, with Pedrini pursuing a solo career and Diego Galeri and Enrico Ghedi founding a new band, I Miura. In 2017 Marimbo published its first American book of Enrico Ghedi: his poems are translated in English by the poet Jack Hirschman.

Personnel
     Omar Pedrini - vocals, guitars
     Diego Galeri - drums
     Enrico Ghedi - keyboards, vocals
     Carlo Alberto 'Illorca' Pellegrini   - bass guitar, vocals
     Pippo Ummarino  - drums (from 1998)
     Sasha Torrisi  - vocals, guitars (from 1998) 
     Francesco Renga   - vocals (1985 - 1998)
     Davide Cavallaro -  bass guitar (1985 - 1988)
     Pietro Paolo Pettenadu -  bass guitar (1985 - 1987)

Discography
Albums
     1986 - The Precious Time Demo (EP)
     1988 - Macchine e dollari (EP) 
     1990 - Colori che esplodono
     1991 - Ritmo e dolore
     1992 - Storie per vivere
     1993 - Viaggio senza vento
     1995 - 2020 SpeedBall
     1997 - Eta Beta
     1999 - 1999
     2001 - El Topo Grand Hotel
     2002 - Un Aldo qualunque sul treno magico
     2003 - Timoria live: generazione senza vento

Further reading
 Pippo Piarulli. TIMORIA - Frammenti Rock. Arcana editrice, 1996. .

References

External links

Italian rock music groups
Living people
Musical groups established in 1985
Musical groups disestablished in 2003
Year of birth missing (living people)
1985 establishments in Italy